Frances Mallalieu Payne (1885–1976), known as Frank Payne, was an Australian artist and illustrator.

Payne was born at Kangaroo Point, Brisbane, Australia on 7 May 1885 to Peel Payne, a shipping clerk, and his wife Julia Finch, née Batchello, who were both born in England.

She was educated at All Hallows' Convent followed by Brisbane Technical College. At the latter she studied portraiture under Godfrey Rivers. She returned to Australia in September 1907. She undertook freelance design work, producing catalogues and magazine covers.

A member of the Society of Women Painters from 1919, she held various positions for several years and contributed to each of its annual exhibitions from 1921. She painted in oils and watercolour. her subjects included children, landscapes and genre paintings. She was the first president of the Women's Industrial Art Society from 1934, and received the King George VI Coronation Medal in 1937.

She died on 11 July 1976 at Normanhurst, Sydney, New South Wales, and was cremated.

A retrospective exhibition of her work, "Frank Payne: The Forgotten Artist" was held at the Redland Art Gallery in Queensland, Australia in 2011.

References

External links 
 Material related to Payne in the Trove Archive
 Works by Payne at ArtNet

1885 births
1976 deaths
Australian women artists
People from Brisbane
Artists from Sydney